Marka is a  long river in Lower Saxony, Germany. At its confluence with the Ohe west of Friesoythe, the river Sagter Ems is formed.

See also
List of rivers of Lower Saxony

References

Rivers of Lower Saxony
Rivers of Germany